Medill is an unincorporated community and census-designated place in Clark County, in the U.S. state of Missouri. As of the 2020 census, its population was 82.

Demographics

Location 
The community s on US Route 136  three miles west of Kahoka.
The Atchison, Topeka and Santa Fe Railroad passes through the community as did the Chicago, Burlington and Quincy Railroad.

History
Medill was laid out in 1888 when the railroad was extended to that point.  A post office was established at Medill in 1889, and remained in operation until 1975.

References

Unincorporated communities in Clark County, Missouri
Unincorporated communities in Missouri